Yaw is a masculine given name originating from the Akan people and their day naming system, meaning born on a Thursday  in Akan language, following their day naming system. People born on particular days are supposed to exhibit the characteristics or attributes and philosophy, associated with the days. Yaw has the appellation  "Preko" or "Opereba" meaning brave.

Origin and meaning of Yaw 
In the Akan culture, day names are known to be derived from deities. Yaw originated from  Yawoada the Day of Reproduction. Males named Yaw are known to be courageous and aggressive in a warlike manner (preko). They tend to be guarded, judgemental and appear to be ungrateful.

Male variants of Yaw 
Day names in Ghana vary in spelling among the various Akan subgroups.  The name is spelt Yaw by the Akuapem, Ashanti and Fante subgroups.

Female version of Yaw 
In the Akan culture and other local cultures in Ghana, day names come in pairs for males and females. The variant of the name used for a female child born on Thursday is Yaa.

Notable people with the name 
Most Ghanaian children have their cultural day names in combination with their English or Christian names. Some notable people with such names are:
Yaw Antwi (born 1985), Ghanaian footballer playing in Serbia
Yaw Amankwah Mireku (born 1979), Ghanaian footballer
Yaw Asante (born 1991), Ghanaian footballer playing in Italy
Yaw Berko (born 1980), Ghanaian footballer playing in Tanzania
Yaw Danso (born 1989), Ghanaian footballer playing in Puerto Rico
Yaw Fosu-Amoah (born 1981), South African long jumper
Yaw Frimpong (born 1986), Ghanaian footballer playing in Congo
Yaw Ihle Amankwah (born 1988), Ghanaian footballer playing in Norway
Yaw Osafo-Marfo, (born 1942) Ghanaian politician and former minister for Education and Finance
Yaw Osene-Akwah (born 1984), Ghanaian youth activist, founding member of Okyeman Youth Association and Okyeman Youth for Development, comes from Akyem Apedwa
Yaw Preko (born 1974), Ghanaian former international footballer
Yaw Tog , Ghanaian rapper

George Yaw Boakye (1937–1979), Ghanaian airman and politician
Eugene Yaw (born 1943), American politician
Joachim Yaw (born 1973), Ghanaian former international footballer and Olympic medalist
Lawrence Henry Yaw Ofosu-Appiah (1920–1990), Ghanaian academic and director of the Encyclopedia Africana
Nana Yaw Konadu Yeboah (born 1964), Ghanaian boxer and former world champion
Nicholas Yaw Boafo Adade, Ghanaian former supreme court judge
Paul Yaw Addo (born 1990), Ghanaian footballer playing in Norway
Samuel Yaw Adusei, Ghanaian politician
William Yaw Obeng (born 1983), Ghanaian former American football offensive lineman

See also
Rao (Chinese surname), sometimes transliterated as Yaw

References 

Akan given names
Masculine given names